Gott segne Sachsenland (lit: God bless Saxony) was the national anthem of the former Saxon Kingdom and now an unofficial anthem of Saxony which is tailored to the popular Saxon monarch, Friedrich Augustus I.

Lyrics

References 

German anthems
Culture of Saxony